Deadly Intruder (aka The Deadly Intruder) is a 1985 horror film.

Plot
In a place called Midvale, a sanitarium patient escapes after dispatching security specialists there and heads off to looking for the love of his life. The disturbed individual is obsessively jealous, slaying anyone whom he fears may be endangering his relationship with his current girlfriend.

Cast
 Molly Cheek as Jessie
 David Schroeder as Grotowski 
 Danny Bonaduce as John
 Stuart Whitman as Captain Pritchett
 Daniel Greene as Danny
 Santos Morales as Carlos
 Steve Perry as Wayne
 Chris Holder as Ben 
 Laura Melton as Amy
 Marcy Hansen as Cathy
 Curt Bryant as Jim
 Stephen Paul as Rogers
 Todd Martin as Mr. West 
 Tommy Ramone (as Tommy Reamon) as Foreman
 W.T. Zacha as Mechanic
 Tony Crupi as Drifter
 Kay St. Germain Wells as Neighbor
 Suzanne Benoit as Salesgirl
 Gerry Landrum as Lineman

Release
The film was released in Finland as Murhaaja saapuu öisin and in West Germany as Der Tödliche Feind.

See also
Exploitation film
Horror-of-personality
Slasher films
Splatter

External links

American slasher films
1985 horror films
1985 films
1980s slasher films
1980s English-language films
1980s American films